Ewart College was a historical women's college located in Toronto, Ontario, Canada, affiliated with the Presbyterian Church in Canada. In September 1991, it merged with Knox College, University of Toronto.

Founded on October 11, 1897, it was then called the Ewart Missionary Training Home, later to be renamed the Presbyterian Missionary and Deaconess Training School.  After a new building was constructed in 1960, it was renamed for Catherine Seaton Ewart; that building, located at 156 St. George Street, is now home to Ernescliff College.

Founded by women, the original purpose of Ewart was to prepare women for missionary service.  In later years, it focused on diaconal ministry and Christian and lay education. Following the Presbyterian Church in Canada's decision to ordain women as Ministers in 1966, the college admitted male students in the 1970s, and in 1991, along with the merger with Knox College, many Ewart graduates have taken further studies to become ordained within the Presbyterian Church.

Ewart Chapel, housed within the Chapel at Knox College, is named after Ewart College, along with the McKay Educational Resource Room.
The Ewart Centre for Lay Education at Knox College, an adult education program, is also named after the institution.  It offers a certificate program in Christian Faith and Life.

See also
 List of current and historical women's universities and colleges

References
 Dickson, Irene and Margaret Webster. 'To Keep the Memory Green: A History of Ewart College 1897-1987' (Toronto: Ewart College, 1986)
 McCarroll-Butler, Pam.  "Reclaiming the story of Ewart College 100 years after its founding."  Presbyterian Record.  October 1, 1997.
 McLelland, Joseph C.  "Post-script: women...and mission?"  Presbyterian Record.  September 1, 1999.

External links
 McKay Educational Resource Collection and Ewart Historical Curriculum, Caven Library, Knox College
Ewart College and Knox College amalgamate, 1991
 Knox College, University of Toronto

Educational institutions established in 1897
Educational institutions disestablished in 1991
Seminaries and theological colleges in Canada
Defunct universities and colleges in Canada
Presbyterian Church in Canada
Universities and colleges in Toronto
Colleges in Ontario
Colleges of the University of Toronto
Former women's universities and colleges in Canada
1897 establishments in Ontario
Women in Ontario